Bulletin of Science, Technology & Society is a bimonthly peer-reviewed academic journal that publishes papers in the field of science education. The editor-in-chief is Jeffry Will (University of North Florida). It was established in 1981 and is currently published by SAGE Publications.

Abstracting and indexing 
Bulletin of Science, Technology & Society is abstracted and indexed in:
 Academic Elite
 Academic Premier
 ERIC
 Horticultural Science Abstracts
 Scopus

External links 
 

SAGE Publishing academic journals
English-language journals
Education journals
Science and technology studies journals
Bimonthly journals
Publications established in 1981